PT Aneka Tambang Tbk, colloquially known as Antam, is an Indonesian mining company. The company primarily produces gold and nickel, and is the largest producer of nickel in Indonesia. Until 2017, Antam was a directly state-owned company, before its ownership was transferred to PT Indonesia Asahan Aluminium (Persero) (Inalum), a government-owned holding company.

History
Antam was established in 1968 by the Indonesian government under Suharto by merging multiple state-owned mining companies. It became a limited company in 1974, and began listing in the Jakarta Stock Exchange in 1997. In 2017, its ownership was transferred from the Indonesian government (which controlled 65 percent of the company's shares) to Inalum in a move intended to create a national holding company.

Due to a government ban on the export of unprocessed ores, Antam began construction of smelter facilities for ferronickel and alumina.

In 2020, it was announced that Antam would form a joint venture with Pertamina and PLN to form an electric vehicle battery company, to be dubbed Indonesia Baterai. Antam's position in the venture is as a provider of upstream raw materials and metals. There are plans for the company to partner with Contemporary Amperex Technology and LG Chem in two projects worth US$ 12 billion.

Operations
As of 2015, Antam was a producer of bauxite, ferronickel, gold, nickel and silver. It is Indonesia's largest producer of nickel, and it lost considerable amounts of revenue and profits following a nickel ore ban. Antam's gold operations was the primary contributor of the company's revenue, making up 71 percent of its Q1 2018 revenue. Antam is the only Indonesian gold refiner to be accredited by the London Bullion Market Association.

References

Mining companies of Indonesia
Companies based in Jakarta
Indonesian companies established in 1968
Non-renewable resource companies established in 1968
Companies listed on the Indonesia Stock Exchange
Companies listed on the Australian Securities Exchange
Government-owned companies of Indonesia
1997 initial public offerings